Justus Ferdinand Poggenburg may refer to:
Justus Ferdinand Poggenburg I (1840–1893), American botanist
Justus Ferdinand Poggenburg II (1865–1917), American billiards champion known as the "father of amateur billiards"
Justus Ferdinand Poggenburg III (1895–1966), American billiards champion